Gorban is a commune in Iași County, Western Moldavia, Romania. It is composed of five villages: Gorban, Gura Bohotin, Podu Hagiului, Scoposeni and Zberoaia.

References

Communes in Iași County
Localities in Western Moldavia
Populated places on the Prut